The Yellow Line, formerly also known as Line 4, is one of the Montreal Metro's four routes operating in Montreal, Quebec, Canada. The line was popular when it opened for service because it connected Downtown Montreal with the Expo 67 exhibition and La Ronde on Île-Sainte-Hélène. The line has three stations and travels under the St. Lawrence River between the Island of Montreal and the city of Longueuil.

The line was numbered in sequence after Line 3, which was later cancelled. It is also the first Metro line to leave the island. All three stations on the line have been renamed since their opening.

History
In November 1961, Montreal City Council decided to build the Metro network. The Yellow Line was not part of the original plans. A year later, however, Montreal's bid to host the 1967 World's Fair (Expo 67) was accepted. Construction of the Red Line (line 3) was cancelled; instead, the Yellow Line was built to develop the exhibition site on two islands in the St. Lawrence River and to connect the rapidly-growing suburb of Longueuil.

The opening of the line took place on April 1, 1967. In the first four weeks, the station on Saint Helen's Island served only the construction workers of the Expo site. The station finally opened to the public on April 28, 1967, the day after the official opening of Expo 67.

Proposed extensions
In June 2008, the City of Montreal proposed a number of service improvements and Metro extensions, including projecting the Yellow Line from Berri-UQAM to McGill station to ease congestion on that part of the Green Line. In December 2011, an extension in Longueuil was announced.

The former Agence métropolitaine de transport (now ARTM) published a study, Vision 2020 in December 2011. The study had plans for the Yellow Line to be extended further into the city of Longueuil along Roland-Therrien Boulevard. The six new stations would connect residential areas, shopping centers, and several schools.

The six proposed stations are at the following intersections:
Saint-Charles/Joliette
Saint-Charles/Saint-Sylvestre
Gentilly/Chambly
Gentilly/Roland-Therrien
Curé-Poirier/Roland-Therrien
Jacques-Cartier/Roland-Therrien

Rolling stock 
At its opening in 1967, MR-63 cars were used on the Yellow Line. Upon the introduction of the MR-73 cars in 1976, the latter stock displaced the older cars. In 2008, MR-63 cars were once again in use on the Yellow Line, but they began to be retired in 2017. In a matter of months, the STM replaced all MR-63 cars with newer MPM-10. The last run of an MR-63 was in June 2018.

List of stations

See also 
 Green Line
 Orange Line
 Blue Line
 Red Line (Line 3)
 List of Montreal Metro stations

References 

 
Rapid transit lines in Canada